Escape from Alcatraz is a 1963 non-fiction book, written by San Francisco Chronicle reporter John Campbell Bruce, about the history of Alcatraz Penitentiary and the escape attempts made by the inmates. It was revised in 1976 and again in 2005.

Portions of this book present the escape of Frank Morris and brothers John and Clarence Anglin, which became the basis for the film Escape from Alcatraz in 1979.

Current edition

References 

1963 non-fiction books
Books about the San Francisco Bay Area
Non-fiction books adapted into films
Escapes and escape attempts from Alcatraz
History of the San Francisco Bay Area
Law enforcement in the San Francisco Bay Area
McGraw-Hill books